Atiq Ullah or Atiqullah (Srinagar 1291-1381H, 1872-1962 CE) was acting Mirwaiz of Kashmir during the 1950s.

His nephew, Mirwaiz Yusuf Shah, was the official mirwaiz, but had been exiled away to Pakistan by the Indian government during the partition of India. His brother Ahmed Ullah or Ahmadullah of Jama Masjid was also a traditionalist Muslim leader. They were known for opposition to the Ahmadiya Movement.

References

1872 births
1962 deaths
People from Srinagar